Home Run is a 2013 Christian sports drama film directed by David Boyd and stars Scott Elrod, Dorian Brown, Vivica A. Fox. the film was released in theaters on April 19, 2013.

Plot
Pro baseball player Cory Brand is forced into a rehabilitation program in his Oklahoma hometown after several alcohol-related incidents. He is responsible for injuring his brother in an alcohol-related crash. Cory reluctantly enters a Celebrate Recovery. He eventually finds new hope when he gets honest about his checkered past, and takes on coaching duties for a Little League team. Cory reunites with his high school girlfriend, starts a relationship with his son and rebuilds his relationship with his family.

Cast

 Scott Elrod as Cory Brand
 Dorian Brown as Emma 
 Charles Henry Wyson as Tyler 
 Vivica A. Fox as Helene 
 James Devoti as Clay
 Nicole Leigh as Karen 
 Drew Waters as Pajersky
 Robert Peters as J.T.
 Samantha Isler as Kendricks

Release and reception
The film had a limited release on April 19, 2013 in the United States and has grossed over $2,861,020.

The film was endorsed by numerous current and former baseball players, including Mariano Rivera, Adam LaRoche, Andy Pettitte, Craig Stammen, Ben Zobrist, R. A. Dickey, Barry Lyons, Bill Buckner, Tim Salmon, Dwight Evans, Jim Sundberg, Brett Butler, and Jose Alvarez, among other sports figures.

On the review aggregator Rotten Tomatoes, the film received 50% positive reviews from 12 critics.

Sean O'Connell of The Washington Post gave the film three stars out of four, saying, "Boyd uses upbeat musical cues and sun-dappled cinematography to manifest an authentic small-town, minor-league atmosphere that’s warm and welcoming, even as it addresses potentially devastating personal problems. There are religious undertones to “Home Run” as Brand labors through his rehabilitation, but Boyd doesn’t succumb to the pressure of clubbing his audience over the head with a metaphorical Louisville Slugger. The director trusts his cast to convey the message.  ... Those seeking riveting baseball sequences might leave frustrated...The strongest scenes take place in dingy hotel rooms, on a deserted farm or in the rehab sessions where Brand and his fellow addicts open their hearts in search of forgiveness."

Betsy Sharkey of the Los Angeles Times was less positive, saying, "Almost from the beginning the message overwhelms the medium," and that the message was "overplayed". She said the portrayal of Cory's alcoholism "unfolds in such fits and starts that we rarely feel Cory's pain." However, she did praise Elrod's acting.

Tom Long of The Detroit News wrote, "Considering it's a movie with an avowed mission; considering that mission has to do with addiction and spiritual righteousness; And considering that the story involves a major league baseball player coaching a Little League team made up of spunky kids... Home Run is actually pretty OK." He added that "director David Boyd has an eye for crisp, lovely compositions. This movie may be preaching to the choir, but at least the preacher has good taste."

References

External links

 
 
 

2013 films
2013 independent films
2010s sports films
American baseball films
Films about evangelicalism
American independent films
2010s English-language films
2010s American films